Timothy Edward Coleman (born 19 June 1971) is a former English cricketer.  Coleman was a right-handed batsman and  bowled right-arm off break.  He was born in Wellingborough, Northamptonshire.

Coleman represented the Northamptonshire Cricket Board in List A cricket.  His debut List A match came against Wiltshire in the 1999 NatWest Trophy.  In 1999 and  2001, he represented the Board in 4 List A matches. Northamptonshire Board beat Yorkshire Cricket Board in the 2nd round of the 2001 Cheltenham & Gloucester Trophy Coleman scoring 82 runs and the  Man of the Match award . He made a half century 68 in round 3 against Northamptonshire County Cricket Club .  In his 4 List A matches, he scored 214 runs at a batting average of 53.50, with 2 half centuries and a high score of 82.

Coleman also played MCCA Knockout Trophy cricket for Cambridgeshire, making his debut for the county against Norfolk and playing 3 further Trophy matches in the 2000 season.

He played  league cricket for Finedon Dolben with 6 Premier league titles and 1 with Wellingborough Town . He's made 35 Northamptonshire league Centuries, 21 of which were in the Premier Division.

Coleman also had 24 Caps playing 8 a side Indoor cricket for England 1991-1998. Playing in 2 world Cups, with the England Team he toured Australia twice, South Africa twice and New Zealand once.

References

External links
Tim Coleman at Cricinfo
Tim Coleman at CricketArchive

1971 births
Living people
People from Wellingborough
English cricketers
Northamptonshire Cricket Board cricketers
Cambridgeshire cricketers